Eupithecia tripolitaniata is a moth in the family Geometridae. It is found in Libya.

References

Moths described in 1959
tripolitaniata
Moths of Africa